Chandraketugarh Sahidullah Smriti Mahavidyalaya, established in 1997, is a general degree college in Berachampa. It offers undergraduate courses in arts.  It is affiliated to West Bengal State University.                                       .       Muhammad Sahidullah

History 
In 2012, students caught for cheating beat up 4 teachers and a non-teaching employee.

Departments

Arts

Bengali
English 
History
Political Science
Philosophy
Education
Sociology
Arabic
 Sanskrit

Science
 Agriculture and 
rural Development

See also
Education in India
List of colleges in West Bengal
Education in West Bengal

References

External links
Chandraketugarh Sahidullah Smriti Mahavidyalaya

Universities and colleges in North 24 Parganas district
Colleges affiliated to West Bengal State University
Educational institutions established in 1997
1997 establishments in West Bengal